A disaccharide (also called a double sugar or biose) is the sugar formed when two monosaccharides are joined by glycosidic linkage. Like monosaccharides, disaccharides are simple sugars soluble in water. Three common examples are sucrose, lactose, and maltose.

Disaccharides are one of the four chemical groupings of carbohydrates  (monosaccharides, disaccharides, oligosaccharides, and polysaccharides). The most common types of disaccharides—sucrose, lactose, and maltose—have 12 carbon atoms, with the general formula C12H22O11. The differences in these disaccharides are due to atomic arrangements within the molecule.

The joining of monosaccharides into a double sugar happens by a condensation reaction, which involves the elimination of a water molecule from the functional groups only. Breaking apart a double sugar into its two monosaccharides is accomplished by hydrolysis with the help of a type of enzyme called a disaccharidase. As building the larger sugar ejects a water molecule, breaking it down consumes a water molecule. These reactions are vital in metabolism. Each disaccharide is broken down with the help of a corresponding disaccharidase (sucrase, lactase, and maltase).

Classification
There are two functionally different classes of disaccharides: 
Reducing disaccharides, in which one monosaccharide, the reducing sugar of the pair, still has a free hemiacetal unit that can perform as a reducing aldehyde group; lactose, maltose and cellobiose are examples of reducing disaccharides, each with one hemiacetal unit, the other occupied by the glycosidic bond, which prevents it from acting as a reducing agent. They can easily be detected by the Woehlk test or Fearon's test on methylamine.
Non-reducing disaccharides, in which the component monosaccharides bond through an acetal linkage between their anomeric centers. This results in neither monosaccharide being left with a hemiacetal unit that is free to act as a reducing agent. Sucrose and trehalose are examples of non-reducing disaccharides because their glycosidic bond is between their respective hemiacetal carbon atoms. The reduced chemical reactivity of the non-reducing sugars in comparison to reducing sugars, may be an advantage where stability in storage is important.

Formation
The formation of a disaccharide molecule from two monosaccharide molecules proceeds by displacing a hydroxy group from one molecule and a hydrogen nucleus (a proton) from the other, so that the now vacant bonds on the monosaccharides join the two monomers together. Because of the removal of the water molecule from the product, the term of convenience for such a process is "dehydration reaction" (also "condensation reaction" or "dehydration synthesis"). For example, milk sugar (lactose) is a disaccharide made by condensation of one molecule of each of the monosaccharides glucose and galactose, whereas the disaccharide sucrose in sugar cane and sugar beet, is a condensation product of glucose and fructose. Maltose, another common disaccharide, is condensed from two glucose molecules.

The dehydration reaction that bonds monosaccharides into disaccharides (and also bonds monosaccharides into more complex polysaccharides) forms what are called glycosidic bonds.

Properties
The glycosidic bond can be formed between any hydroxy group on the component monosaccharide. So, even if both component sugars are the same (e.g., glucose), different bond combinations (regiochemistry) and stereochemistry (alpha- or beta-) result in disaccharides that are diastereoisomers with different chemical and physical properties. Depending on the monosaccharide constituents, disaccharides are sometimes crystalline, sometimes water-soluble, and sometimes sweet-tasting and sticky-feeling. Disaccharides can serve as functional groups by forming glycosidic bonds with other organic compounds, forming glycosides.

Assimilation

Digestion of disaccharides involves breakdown into monosaccharides.

Common disaccharides
{| class="wikitable"
|-
! Disaccharide !! Unit 1 !! Unit 2 !! Bond
|-
| Sucrose (table sugar, cane sugar, beet sugar, or saccharose)
|                                 Glucose || Fructose || α(1→2)β
|-
| Lactose (milk sugar) || Galactose || Glucose || β(1→4)
|-
| Maltose (malt sugar) || Glucose || Glucose || α(1→4)
|-
| Trehalose || Glucose || Glucose || α(1→1)α
|-
| Cellobiose || Glucose || Glucose || β(1→4)
|-
| Chitobiose || Glucosamine || Glucosamine || β(1→4)
|}

Maltose, cellobiose, and chitobiose are hydrolysis products of the polysaccharides starch, cellulose, and chitin, respectively.

Less common disaccharides include:

{| class="wikitable"
|-
! Disaccharide !! Units !! Bond
 |-
 | Kojibiose  || two glucose monomers || α(1→2)
 |-
 | Nigerose || two glucose monomers || α(1→3)
 |-
 | Isomaltose  || two glucose monomers || α(1→6)
 |-
 | β,β-Trehalose || two glucose monomers || β(1→1)β
 |-
 | α,β-Trehalose || two glucose monomers || α(1→1)β
 |-
 | Sophorose || two glucose monomers || β(1→2)
 |-
 | Laminaribiose || two glucose monomers || β(1→3)
 |-
 | Gentiobiose || two glucose monomers || β(1→6)
|-
|Trehalulose
|a glucose monomer and a fructose monomer
|α(1→1)
|-
 | Turanose || a glucose monomer and a fructose monomer || α(1→3)
 |-
 | Maltulose || a glucose monomer and a fructose monomer || α(1→4)
 |- 
 | Leucrose || a glucose monomer and a fructose monomer || α(1→5)
 |-
 | Isomaltulose || a glucose monomer and a fructose monomer || α(1→6)
 |-
 | Gentiobiulose  || a glucose monomer and a fructose monomer || β(1→6)
 |-
 | Mannobiose || two mannose monomers || either α(1→2), α(1→3), α(1→4), or α(1→6)
 |-
 | Melibiose  || a galactose monomer and a glucose monomer || α(1→6)
 |-
 | Allolactose  || a galactose monomer and a glucose monomer || β(1→6)
 |-
 | Melibiulose  || a galactose monomer and a fructose monomer || α(1→6)
 |-
 | Lactulose  || a galactose monomer and a fructose monomer || β(1→4)
 |-
 | Rutinose  || a rhamnose monomer and a glucose monomer || α(1→6)
 |-
 | Rutinulose  || a rhamnose monomer and a fructose monomer || β(1→6)
 |-
 | Xylobiose  || two xylopyranose monomers || β(1→4)
|}

References

External links

 
Carbohydrate chemistry